Club Deportes Puerto Montt is a Chilean football club based in the city of Puerto Montt, Los Lagos Region. The club was founded on May 6, 1983, and currently plays in the Primera B de Chile, the second division of the country.

Their home games are played at the Estadio Regional de Chinquihue, located in Puerto Montt in front of the Tenglo Island, which has a capacity of 10,000 seats and hosted the 2015 FIFA U-17 World Cup. The stadium is known as one of the most austral stadiums in the world  and for the Tenglo Canal view from every point of the place.

The club emblem is a dolphin standing between the city flag and a football. The club has a long-standing rivalry with regional neighbours Provincial Osorno and with Deportes Valdivia, as well as with clubs from Santiago.

History

The Club de Deportes Puerto Montt started its activities as a sports facility on May 6, 1983, playing in the actually Primera B de Chile.

On the sports have been mixed results, among which the runner-up of the Torneo Apertura Segunda Division in 1990, further promotion to First Division in 1996 (as second runner-category). In the year 2001 drops to the second level (Primera B). In 2002 returns to the Primera Division, when champion of the Primera B.

In the year 2006 is located in the 3rd position in the regular face of the Clausura 2006 fighting until the latest weeks by the quota Chile 3 than classified to the Copa Libertadores de America. Reached the stage of plays-off to get the lead in Group C (33 points) but stay in Quarter-final at the hands which eventually by the champion of the tournament, Colo Colo.

In the year 2007, in Apertura 2007 finished in 18th place after a poor campaign. In the Clausura 2007 not greatly improved its performance and won the 16th place in the tournament and 18th place in the acumuled table, (The penultimate scene of the 21 teams who had) which granted the Liguilla de Promocion to Primera A, which after 2 wins and 2 defeats at home visit as it is located on the 2nd place of the triangular and descends to the Primera B.

Stadium

Estadio Regional de Chinquihue is a multi-use stadium in Puerto Montt, Chile.  It is currently used mostly for football matches and is the home stadium of Deportes Puerto Montt. The stadium was built in 1982, with an original capacity of 11,300.

In 2011 and 2013 it was completely renovated, and currently holds 10,000 people. The stadium hosted seven matches of the 2015 FIFA U-17 World Cup.

Players

Current squad

2021 Winter Transfers

In

Out

Managers

 Jorge Socías (1987)
 Francisco Valdés (1993–94)
 Jorge Garcés (1997)
 Alicio Solalinde (1998–99)
 Wladimir Bigorra (2000)
 Fernando Díaz (2001)
 Sergio Nichiporuk (2001–02)
 Jorge Luis Siviero (2007)
 Jaime Vera (2008–10)
 Jorge Contreras (2011)
 Alejandro Hisis (2011–12)
 Gino Valentini (2012)
 Nelson Mores (2013)
 Gino Valentini (2013)
 Gerardo Silva (2013–14)
 Erwin Durán (2014–2017)
 Oscar Correa (2017)
 Luis Landeros (2018)
 Fernando Vergara (2018–19)
 Jorge Aravena (2020–2021)
 Felipe Cornejo (2021)
 Erwin Durán (2022–)

Honours

Domestic
Primera B: 1
2002

Segunda División: 1
2014–15

See also
 Puerto Montt
 2015 FIFA U-17 World Cup

References

External links
  Official Website

Deportes Puerto Montt
Puerto Montt
Association football clubs established in 1983
Sport in Los Lagos Region
1983 establishments in Chile
Puerto Montt